The East African campaign in World War I was a series of battles and guerrilla actions, which started in German East Africa (GEA) and spread to portions of Mozambique, Rhodesia, British East Africa, the Uganda, and the Belgian Congo. The campaign all but ended in German East Africa in November 1917 when the Germans entered Mozambique and continued the campaign living off Portuguese supplies.

The strategy of the German colonial forces, led by Lieutenant Colonel (later Major General) Paul von Lettow-Vorbeck, was to divert Allied forces from the Western Front to Africa. His strategy achieved only mixed results after 1916 when he was driven out of German East Africa. The campaign in Africa consumed considerable amounts of money and war material that could have gone to other fronts.

The Germans in East Africa fought for the whole of the war, receiving word of the armistice on 14 November 1918 at 07:30 hours. Both sides waited for confirmation, with the Germans formally surrendering on 25 November. GEA became two League of Nations Class B Mandates, Tanganyika Territory of the United Kingdom and Ruanda-Urundi of Belgium, while the Kionga Triangle was ceded to Portugal.

Background

German East Africa

German East Africa (Deutsch-Ostafrika) was colonized by the Germans in 1885. The territory itself spanned  and covered the areas of modern-day Rwanda, Burundi and Tanzania. The colony's indigenous population numbered seven and a half million and was governed by just 5,300 Europeans. Although the colonial regime was relatively secure, the colony had recently been shaken by the Maji Maji Rebellion of 1904–1905. The German colonial administration could call on a military Schutztruppe ("Protection force") of 260 Europeans and 2,470 Africans, in addition to 2,700 white settlers who were part of the reservist Landsturm, as well as a small paramilitary Gendarmerie.

The outbreak of World War I in Europe led to the increased popularity of German colonial expansion and the creation of a Deutsch-Mittelafrika ("German Central Africa") which would parallel a resurgent German Empire in Europe. Mittelafrika effectively involved the annexation of territory, mostly occupied by the Belgian Congo, in order to link the existing German colonies in East, South-west and West Africa. The territory would dominate central Africa and would make Germany by far the most powerful colonial power on the African continent. Nevertheless, the German colonial military in Africa was weak, poorly equipped and widely dispersed. Although better trained and more experienced than their opponents, many of the German soldiers were reliant on weapons like the Model 1871 rifle which used obsolete black powder. At the same time the militaries of the Allied powers were also encountering similar problems of poor equipment and low numbers; most colonial militaries were intended to serve as local paramilitary police to suppress resistance to colonial rule and were neither equipped nor structured to fight against foreign powers. Even so, the largest military concentration in the German colonial empire was in East Africa.

German strategy
The objective of the German forces in East Africa, led by Lieutenant-Colonel Paul von Lettow-Vorbeck, was to divert Allied forces and supplies from Europe to Africa. By threatening the important British Uganda Railway, Lettow hoped to force British troops to invade East Africa, where he could fight a defensive campaign. In 1912, the German government had formed a defensive strategy for East Africa in which the military would withdraw to the hinterland and fight a guerilla campaign. The German colony in East Africa was a threat to the neutral Belgian Congo but the Belgian government hoped to continue its neutrality in Africa. The Force Publique was constrained to adopt a defensive strategy until 15 August 1914, when German ships on Lake Tanganyika bombarded the port of Mokolobu and then the Lukuga post a week later. Some Belgian officials viewed hostilities in East Africa as an opportunity to expand Belgian holdings in Africa; the capture of Ruanda and Urundi could increase the bargaining power of the De Broqueville government to ensure the restoration of Belgium after the war. During the post-war negotiation of the Treaty of Versailles, the Colonial Minister, Jules Renkin, sought to trade Belgian territorial gains in German East Africa for the Portuguese allocation in northern Angola, to gain Belgian Congo a longer coast.

Initial fighting, 1914–1915

Outbreak and early German attacks

The governors of the British and German East Africa wanted to avoid war and preferred a neutrality agreement based on the Congo Act of 1885, against the wishes of the local military commanders and their metropolitan governments. The agreement caused confusion in the opening weeks of the conflict. On 31 July, implementing contingency plans, the cruiser  sailed from Dar-es-Salaam for operations against British commerce. She narrowly avoided cruisers from the Cape Squadron sent to shadow the ship and be ready to sink it. On 5 August 1914, troops from the Uganda protectorate assaulted German river outposts near Lake Victoria.

On the same day, the British War Cabinet ordered an Indian Expeditionary Force (IEF) to be sent to East Africa to eliminate bases for raiders. On 8 August, the Royal Navy cruiser  shelled the wireless station at Dar es Salaam, then agreed a ceasefire, on condition the town remained an open city. This agreement caused discord between Vorbeck and Governor Heinrich Schnee, his nominal superior, who opposed and later ignored the agreement; it also caused the captain of Astraea to be reprimanded for exceeding his authority. Before the Battle of Tanga when the IEF attempted to land at Tanga, the Royal Navy felt obliged to give warning that they were abrogating the agreement, forfeiting surprise.

In August 1914, the military and para-military forces in both colonies were mobilised, despite restrictions imposed by the two governors. The German Schutztruppe in East Africa had  of all ranks and  equivalent to the two battalions of the King's African Rifles (KAR) in the British East African colonies. On 7 August, German troops at Moshi were informed that the neutrality agreement was at an end and ordered to raid across the border. On 15 August, Askari in the Neu Moshi region engaged in their first offensive operation of the campaign. Taveta on the British side of Kilimanjaro fell, to two companies of Askari (300 men) with the British firing a token volley and retiring in good order. The Askari detachment on Lake Tanganyika raided Belgian facilities seeking to destroy the steamer Commune and gain control of the lake. On 24 August, German troops attacked Portuguese outposts across the Rovuma, unsure of the intentions of Portugal, which was not yet a British ally, which caused a diplomatic incident which was only smoothed over with difficulty.

In September, the Germans began to raid deeper into British Kenya and Uganda. German naval power on Lake Victoria was limited to Hedwig von Wissmann and Kingani a tugboat armed with one pom-pom-gun, causing minor damage and a great deal of noise. The Germans later raised Kingani, dismounted her gun and used the tug as a transport; with the tug disarmed and her "teeth removed, British command of Lake Victoria was no longer in dispute."

British land and naval offensive

To solve the raiding nuisance and to capture the northern, colonised region of the German colony, the British devised a plan for a two-pronged invasion. After capturing Tanga, IEF "B" would rapidly move north-west, join IEF "C" and mop up the remaining German forces. Although outnumbered  Tanga and  Longido, the Schutztruppe under Vorbeck prevailed. In the East Africa volume of the British official history (1941), Charles Hordern described the events as one of "the most notable failures in British military history".

Only two British regiments were involved in the East African campaign. The 2nd Battalion, Loyal North Lancashire Regiment arrived with the Indian Army invasion force at Tanga and after this stayed on the border between British and German East Africa. The 25th (Frontiersmen) Battalion, Royal Fusiliers was raised for service in East Africa in early 1915 and served throughout the war. In addition, white contingents were supplied by Rhodesia in 1914-15, the 2nd Rhodesia Regiment, Nyasaland and South Africa including the South African Expeditionary Force which arrived in February 1916.

Königsberg of the Imperial German Navy was in the Indian Ocean when war was declared. In the Battle of Zanzibar, Königsberg sank the old protected cruiser  in Zanzibar harbour and then retired into the Rufiji River delta. After being cornered by warships of the British Cape Squadron, including an old pre-dreadnought battleship, two shallow-draught monitors with  guns were brought from England and demolished the cruiser on 11 July 1915. The British salvaged and used six  guns from Pegasus, which became known as the Peggy guns; the crew of Königsberg and the  main battery guns were taken over by the Schutztruppe and were used until the end of hostilities.

Lake Tanganyika expedition

The Germans had controlled the lake since the outbreak of the war, with three armed steamers and two unarmed motor boats. In 1915, two British motorboats, HMS Mimi and Toutou each armed with a 3-pounder and a Maxim gun, were transported  by land to the British shore of Lake Tanganyika. They captured the German ship Kingani on 26 December, renaming it  and with two Belgian ships under the command of Commander Geoffrey Spicer-Simson, attacked and sank the German ship Hedwig von Wissmann. The Graf von Götzen and the Wami, an unarmed motor boat, became the only German ships left on the lake. In February 1916, the Wami was intercepted and run ashore by the crew and burned. Lettow-Vorbeck then had its Königsberg gun removed and sent by rail to the main fighting front. The ship was scuttled in mid-July after a seaplane bombing attack by the Belgians on Kigoma and before advancing Belgian colonial troops could capture it; Wami was later re-floated and used by the British.

Allied offensives, 1916–1917

British Empire reinforcements, 1916

General Horace Smith-Dorrien was assigned with orders to find and fight the Schutztruppe but he contracted pneumonia during the voyage to South Africa, which prevented him from taking command. In 1916, General Jan Smuts was given the task of defeating Lettow-Vorbeck. A large Carrier Corps composed of African porters under British command, carried supplies into the interior. Despite the Allied nature of the effort, it was a South African operation of the British Empire. During the previous year, Lettow-Vorbeck had also gained personnel and his army was now 

Another contingent advanced over Lake Nyasa (Lake Malawi) from the south-east. All these forces failed to capture Lettow-Vorbeck and they all suffered from disease along the march. The 9th South African Infantry, started with 1,135 men in February, and by October its strength was reduced to 116 fit troops, with little fighting. The Germans nearly always retreated from the larger British troop concentrations and by September 1916, the German Central Railway from the coast at Dar es Salaam to Ujiji was fully under British control.

With Lettow-Vorbeck confined to the southern part of German East Africa, Smuts began to withdraw the South African, Rhodesian and Indian troops and replace them with Askari of the King's African Rifles (KAR), which by November 1918 had  By the start of 1917, more than half the British Army in the theatre was composed of Africans and by the end of the war, it was nearly all-African. Smuts left the area in January 1917, to join the Imperial War Cabinet at London.

Belgian offensives, 1916–17

The British conscripted  to move Belgian supplies and equipment to Kivu (in the east of the Belgian Congo) between late 1915 and early 1916. The lines of communication in the Congo required  carriers, who were barred by the Belgian government from crossing into German East Africa; Belgian troops were expected to live off the land. To avoid the plundering of civilians, loss of food stocks and risk of famine, with many farmers already conscripted and moved away from their land, the British set up the Congo Carrier Section of the East India Transport Corps (Carbel) with  conscripted from Ugandan civilians and assembled at Mbarara in April 1916. The , started its campaign on 18 April 1916 under the command of General Charles Tombeur, Colonel Philippe Molitor and Colonel Frederik-Valdemar Olsen and captured Kigali in Rwanda on 6 May.

The  and the British Lake Force then started a thrust to capture Tabora, an administrative base in central German East Africa. Three columns took Biharamuro, Mwanza, Karema, Kigoma and Ujiji. At the Battle of Tabora on 19 September, the Germans were defeated and the village occupied. During the march, Carbel lost  died or missing presumed dead, a rate of  occurred despite the presence of two doctors and adequate medical supplies. To prevent Belgian claims on German territory in a post-war settlement, Smuts ordered their forces to return to the Congo, leaving them as occupiers only in Rwanda and Burundi. The British were obliged to recall Belgian troops in 1917 and the two allies coordinated campaign plans.

British offensive, 1917
Major-General Arthur Hoskins (KAR), formerly the commander of the 1st East Africa Division, took over command of the campaign. After four months spent reorganising the lines of communication, he was then replaced by South African Major-General Jacob van Deventer. Deventer began an offensive in July 1917, which by early autumn had pushed the Germans  to the south. From  1917, Lettow-Vorbeck fought a costly battle at Mahiwa, with  casualties and  losses in the Nigerian brigade. After the news of the battle reached Germany, Lettow-Vorbeck was promoted to Generalmajor.

German offensives, 1917–18

Portuguese Mozambique

British units forced the Schutztruppe south and on 23 November, Lettow-Vorbeck crossed into  Mozambique to plunder supplies from Portuguese garrisons. Lettow-Vorbeck divided his force into three groups on the march; a detachment of  under Hauptmann Theodor Tafel ran out of food and ammunition and was forced to surrender before reaching Mozambique. Lettow and Tafel were unaware they were only one day's march apart. The Germans fought the Battle of Ngomano in which the Portuguese garrison was routed, then marched through Mozambique in caravans of troops, carriers, wives and children for nine months but were unable to gain much strength. In Mozambique, the Schutztruppe won a number of important victories which allowed it to remain active but also came close to destruction during the Battle of Lioma and Battle of Pere Hills.

Northern Rhodesia
The Germans returned to German East Africa and crossed into Rhodesia in August 1918. from early October, news that could be gleaned went from bad to worse. It was rumoured that Hindenburg was dead and that the Allies were about to impose an armistice on Germany and morale amongst the Germans plunged and desertions by carriers increased. On 9 November the German force reached Kasama whose district officer, Hector Croad, had evacuated the town on hearing of the German approach and stripped it of ammunition. The Germans pursued Croad who had lodged the supplies in a rubber factory on the opposite side of the Chambezi River. The Germans began probing attacks on the factory on 12 November, as Lettow-Vorbeck and his column arrived. The Germans captured the factory after a four-hour engagement and the British melted away to the west. A British dispatch rider fell into German hands who told the Germans of the Armistice of 11 November 1918. The information arrived in time to forestall another attack on the rubber factory and Croad met Lettow-Vorbeck, who found it difficult to believe that Germany had lost the war and impossible to accept that the Kaiser had fled to Holland and that Germany had become a republic.

German surrender
Brigadier-General William Edwards, Lettow-Vorbeck, Walter Spangenburg, and Captain Anderson, Edwards declining Lettow-Vorbeck's sword. The governor of German East Africa, Heinrich Schnee did not sign the surrender to signify that Germans renounced claims to the colony. Article XVII of the armistice required the evacuation of the German forces from East Africa but the War Office interpreted this as to need unconditional surrender and disarmament, which was carried off "by a judicious mixture of firmness and bluff". Lettow-Vorbeck smelt a rat but was unable to confirm his suspicions with Berlin and gave way under protest. The campaign cost the British  at 2007 prices.

Aftermath

Analysis
Nearly 400,000 Allied soldiers, sailors, merchant marine crews, builders, bureaucrats and support personnel participated in the East Africa campaign. They were assisted in the field by 600,000 African bearers. The Allies employed nearly one million people in their fruitless pursuit of Lettow-Vorbeck and his small force. Lettow-Vorbeck was cut off and could entertain no hope of victory. His strategy was to keep as many British forces diverted to his pursuit for as long as possible and to make the British expend the largest amount of resources in men, shipping and supplies against him. While some shipping was diverted to the African theatre, it was not enough to inflict significant difficulties on the Allied navies.

Soon after the end of World War I, the narrative about the East African campaign became the subject of mythologization and distortions. Upon returning home, the Schutztruppe veterans, most importantly Lettow-Vorbeck, were treated as "heroes" by Germans who "refused to accept the reality of defeat in the field". Lettow-Vorbeck supported the narrative that his force had remained undefeated. By the time of his surrender, he insisted on signing the surrender documents on several conditions, including that his force was recorded as having stayed in the field until the conflict's end. In reality, he agreed to an unconditional surrender, albeit under protest. In the years after the war, German colonial and military literature as well as the Nazi Party pushed the view that Lettow-Vorbeck had been "undefeated in the field" as part of the larger stab-in-the-back myth. In Germany, Lettow-Vorbeck and the East African campaign became the subject of songs and glorification. Many Allied commanders also felt great respect for the East African Schutztruppe and Lettow-Vorbeck in particular, further enhancing their military reputation. 

Views about Lettow-Vorbeck's campaign vary. A large number of modern historians and other researchers have continued to describe the Germans in East Africa as undefeated by the end of the war. A growing number of German historians have criticised this view since the 1990s, alongside other narratives about Lettow-Vorbeck as outdated, biased and based on post-war legends.

Society and economy

The fighting in East Africa led to an export boom in British East Africa and an increase in the political influence of White Kenyans. In 1914, the Kenyan economy was in decline but because of emergency legislation giving white colonists control over black-owned land in 1915, exports rose from £3.35 million to £5.9 million by 1916. The increase in the value of exports was mostly due to products like raw cotton and tea. White control of the economy rose from 14 per cent to 70 per cent by 1919.

The campaign and recruiting in Nyasaland contributed to the outbreak of the Chilembwe rebellion in January 1915, by John Chilembwe, an American-educated Baptist minister. Chilembwe was motivated by grievances against the colonial system including forced labour and racial discrimination. The revolt broke out in the evening of 23 January 1915 when rebels, incited by Chilembwe, attacked the headquarters of the A. L. Bruce Plantation at Magomero and killed three white colonists. An abortive attack on an armoury in Blantyre followed during the night. By the morning of 24 January the colonial authorities had mobilised the colonial militia and redeployed regular military units from the KAR. After a failed attack by government troops on Mbombwe on 25 January, the rebels attacked a Christian mission at Nguludi and burned it down. Mbombwe was retaken by government forces unopposed on 26 January. Many of the rebels, including Chilembwe, fled towards Portuguese Mozambique but most were captured. About forty rebels were executed in the aftermath and 300 were imprisoned; Chilembwe was shot dead by a police patrol near the border on 3 February. Although the rebellion did not achieve lasting success, it is commonly cited as a watershed in Malawian history.

Casualties

By 1917, the conscription of  Africans as carriers, depopulated many districts and  porters had died, among them  of the Carrier Corps in East Africa. The campaign cost the British £70 million, close to the war budget set in 1914. A Colonial Office official wrote that the East African campaign had not become a scandal only "... because the people who suffered most were the carriers - and after all, who cares about native carriers?". The Belgian record of  includes  killed in action or died of disease but excludes  deaths. Portuguese casualties in Africa were  killed,  missing or captured and an unknown but significant number wounded.

In the German colonies, no records of the number of people conscripted or casualties were kept but in Der Weltkrieg, the German official history, Ludwig Boell (1951) wrote "... of the loss of levies, carriers, and boys (sic) [we could] make no overall count due to the absence of detailed sickness records". The conscription of farm labour in British East Africa and the failure of the 1917–1918 rains, led to famine and in September the 1918 flu pandemic reached sub-Saharan Africa. Overall, the German conduct of war directly led to the death of at least 350,000 civilians in East Africa; most German colonial soldiers and officers, including Lettow-Vorbeck, never expressed remorse for these losses.

Notes

Footnotes

Bibliography

Books
 
 
 
 
 
 
 
 
 
 
 
 
 
 
 
 
 
 
 
 
 
 
 
 
 
 
 

Journals
 
 
  
  

Websites

Further reading

Books
 
 
 
 
 
 
 
 
 
 
 
 
 
 
 
 
 
 
 
 
 
 
 
 

Journals
 

Theses

External links

 The Evacuation of Kasama in 1918
 The German East Africa Campaign 1914–1918
 The War with Germany in East Africa
 Rutherford, Alan. Kaputala, 2nd edition, Hand Over Fist Press, 2014.
 The Zeppelin Airship Era
 
 Digre, Brian : Colonial Warfare and Occupation (Africa), in: 1914-1918-online. International Encyclopedia of the First World War.

01
.East Africa
Campaigns and theatres of World War I
East Africa
Belgian Congo in World War I
East Africa Protectorate
German East Africa
Northern Rhodesia
Rhodesia in World War I
Uganda Protectorate
Military history of German East Africa
Military history of Mozambique
Military history of Tanzania
Battles of World War I involving Germany
Battles of World War I involving South Africa
Battles of World War I involving the United Kingdom
Battles of World War I involving Portugal
Battles of World War I involving Belgium
Battles involving the Force Publique
Jan Smuts
1910s in Africa
1910s in the Belgian Congo
1910s in German East Africa
1910s in Kenya
1910s in Northern Rhodesia
1910s in Uganda
Military history of Africa